Konnunsuo is a small village of the former municipality of Joutseno, today part of the Lappeenranta in South Karelia, Finland. In 2020, only 73 people lived in the village postal code area. The landscape of the central part of the village is dominated by the former , which was turned into an agricultural prison in the early 20th century. Officially, prison operations in Konnunsuo ended in May 2011.

In the summers of 2009–2017, a music-focused, interdisciplinary Kontufolk festival was organized in Konnunsuo.

References

External links
 Lappeenranta – Konnunsuo landscape area – Saimaa Geopark (in English)
 Konnunsuo's location – Fonecta
 Mari Lukkari: Kylmä ja maaginen Konnunsuo – Yle, 2 February 2016. (in Finnish)

Lappeenranta
Villages in Finland